August Aloysius Johannes Menken (23 June 1858, Cologne - 18 September 1903, Berlin) was a German architect most notable for his historicist Roman Catholic churches.

Architects from Cologne
1858 births
1903 deaths
19th-century German architects